United States gubernatorial elections were held on November 3, 1992, in 12 states and two territories. Going into the elections, six of the seats were held by Democrats and six by Republicans. After the elections, eight seats were held by Democrats and four by Republicans. The elections coincided with the presidential election.

This was the last year in which Rhode Island held a gubernatorial election in the same year as the presidential election. The length of gubernatorial terms for Rhode Island's governor would be extended from two to four years, with elections taking place in midterm election years.

Election results

States

Territories

Closest races 
States where the margin of victory was under 5%:
 Montana, 2.7%
 Puerto Rico, 4.0%
 Washington, 4.3%

States where the margin of victory was under 10%:
 Utah, 8.6%
 North Carolina, 9.5%

Notes

References

See also
1992 United States elections
1992 United States presidential election
1992 United States Senate elections
1992 United States House of Representatives elections

 
November 1992 events in the United States